Triptych Inspired by T.S. Eliot's Poem "Sweeney Agonistes" is a 1967 triptych by British painter and artist Francis Bacon. It is a part of the collection of the Hirshhorn Museum and Sculpture Garden in Washington, D.C.

References

Paintings by Francis Bacon
1967 paintings
Smithsonian Institution